As Everything Unfolds is a British rock band from High Wycombe, Buckinghamshire, England.

Formation and history

The band formed in 2013 as an acoustic paring of Alex Paton and current guitarist, Adam Kerr. Their second EP, Closure, was released in 2018 to positive reviews. In September 2020, the band signed with Long Branch Records, an imprint of SPV Schallplatten. They released their first full-length album, Within Each Lies The Other, on March 26, 2021. On May 13, 2022, Owen Hill left the band on good terms to pursue new goals.

Musical style 
The group's sound incorporates elements of alternative rock, post-hardcore, and progressive metal, while lead singer Charlie Rolfe's vocal style has been described as a mixture of Hayley Williams, Amy Lee and Becca Macintyre.

Members
Charlie Rolfe - lead vocals
Adam Kerr - lead guitar
George Hunt - bass
Jon Cassidy - synths/programming
Jamie Gowers - drums

Discography

Studio albums

Extended plays

References

External links
 Official Facebook
 Official Twitter

Long Branch Records artists
Post-hardcore groups
English alternative rock groups
Female-fronted musical groups